The 1987 All-Ireland Minor Football Championship was the 56th staging of the All-Ireland Minor Football Championship, the Gaelic Athletic Association's premier inter-county Gaelic football tournament for boys under the age of 18.

Galway entered the championship as defending champions, however, they were defeated by Cork in the All-Ireland semi-final.

On 20 September 1987, Down won the championship following a 1-12 to 1-5 defeat of Cork in the All-Ireland final. This was their second All-Ireland title overall and their first in ten championship seasons.

Future Comedian Patrick Kielty was on the Down team.

Results

Connacht Minor Football Championship

Semi-Finals

Final

Leinster Minor Football Championship

Quarter-Finals

Semi-Finals

Final

Munster Minor Football Championship

Quarter-Finals

Semi-Finals

Finals

Ulster Minor Football Championship

Preliminary Round

Quarter-Finals

Semi-Finals

Final

All-Ireland Minor Football Championship

Semi-Finals

Final

Championship statistics

Miscellaneous

 Cork set a new record by becoming the first team to be defeated in three successive All-Ireland finals.

References

1987
All-Ireland Minor Football Championship